All India Institute of Technology, Hyderabad (Hyderabad) is a university, founded in 2004, located near Hyderabad, Telangana, India.  Hyderabad is best known for engineering courses. The university is situated in Kukatpally and has an enrollment of approximately 1,000 students.

Administration
All India Institute of Technology, Hyderabad is a multimedia educational system with printed course material for self-study. The current president of the university is Syed Afsaruddin.

Academics
All India Institute of Technology, Hyderabad is an institute with primarily academic and research-oriented courses.

The undergraduate programs offered are Bachelor's in technological programs with different specializations. The major specializations offered are Information Technology, Electronics, Electrical, Instrumentation, with correspondence courses offered as well.

The postgraduate programs offered are M.Tech., MSIT, MBA, MCA and MSc. Major branches include Electronic Engineering, Communication Engineering, Mechanical Engineering, Management and Computer Applications.

Departments
 Bioinformatics (Department of Computer Science, School of Information Technology)
 Electronics and Communication Engineering
 Electrical and Electronics Engineering
 Electronics & Instrumental Engineering
 Electronics & Computer Engineering
 Electronics & Control Engineering
 Computer Science & Engineering
 Software Engineering
 Systems Engineering

See also 
Education in India
Literacy in India
Indian Institutes of Technology
List of institutions of higher education in Telangana

References

External links
Official Website IIT Hyderabad
  IIT Council

Engineering colleges in Hyderabad, India
All India Council for Technical Education
2004 establishments in Andhra Pradesh
Educational institutions established in 2004